Mia Zachary is an American author of contemporary romance novels.

Biography
Zachary first began writing as a child, creating picture books with simple dialogue for her younger brother. In the late 1980s, she began her first novel, a medieval historical romance, but did not finish it because of the research it necessitated. In 1998, she formed an online publishing company. At a Romance Writers of America conference in 2000, she was inspired by a story told by a fellow author, Kelsey Roberts, about finding a single red shoe under the bed of her hotel room. She wrote a manuscript, Red Shoes And a Diary, which did not sell well through her online company. She rewrote the story and submitted it to Harlequin Temptation, which rejected the story. Zachary entered two of the love scenes from her novel into Harlequin's Summer Blaze writing contest. She won the contest, a chance to have an editor read her full manuscript. The editor purchased the novel, which was published in April 2003.

Zachary says that she writes "romance fiction [because it] is stories about friendship and intimacy, love and respect, commitment, and responsibility".

Novels
Red Shoes and a Diary (2003)
Yours in Black Lace (2004)
9½ Days (2004)
Afternoon Delight (2006)
Another Side of Midnight (2007)

Omnibus
Witchy Business: Under His Spell / Disenchanted? / Spirit Dance (2007) (with Julie Elizabeth Leto, Rhonda Nelson)

References

External links
 Official website 

Living people
21st-century American novelists
American romantic fiction writers
American women novelists
Year of birth missing (living people)
21st-century American women writers